Cornelius Johannes du Preez de Villiers, also known as CJ de Villiers (born 16 March 1986) is a South African cricketer. He is a tall (6'4") right-handed batsman and a right-arm fast-medium bowler, who plays for Free State and Titans cricket teams.

Career

de Villiers made his first-class debut in 2006, scoring a total of 49 runs and taking one wicket for Free State in a match against Namibia. He followed 19 wickets in his debut season with a haul of forty in 2007–08, which left him as the sixth highest wicket-taker of the season.

In 2008 de Villiers played in South Africa A's unofficial Test series against Sri Lanka A, taking 5 for 36 during Sri Lanka's first innings in the second match.

Notes

External links 

1986 births
Living people
South African cricketers
Knights cricketers
Free State cricketers
University of Pretoria cricketers
People from Kroonstad